Arthur Phillip Freeman (born 1972) is an Australian man charged, tried and convicted of murdering his daughter, Darcey Iris Freeman, aged 4, on 29 January 2009 by deliberately throwing her off the side of the West Gate Bridge in Melbourne, Victoria.

On 11 April 2011, Freeman was sentenced to life in prison for the murder with a minimum non-parole period of 32 years.

Incident
At approximately 9:15 am on 29 January 2009, Freeman, en route to Melbourne from his parents' home at Aireys Inlet, pulled his white Toyota Land Cruiser 4WD into the then-emergency stopping lane on the West Gate Bridge. He got out of the vehicle, removed his daughter from the back seat, took her over to the railing and dropped her  into the water below. He then drove off.

At 10:30 am, Freeman walked into the Commonwealth Law Courts in Melbourne. He was said to be hysterical, crying and sobbing. Darcey was rescued but died in the Royal Children's Hospital, Melbourne, at 1:35 pm. Freeman was then arrested and charged with murder.

The case soon became high profile because of its nature and also as it happened during rush hour traffic when there were many witnesses to the incident. These included Darcey's two brothers who witnessed the incident from Freeman's car.

It is thought the incident led to the subsequent decision to place anti-suicide barriers along the whole length of the West Gate Bridge. Soon after the incident temporary barriers were placed alongside the existing railing.

Trial
Freeman had been in custody proceedings with his ex-wife Peta Barnes. Barnes had recently been granted more time with the children, which angered Freeman. Freeman was alleged to have said to Barnes minutes before the incident, "Say goodbye to your children." Lawyers acting on behalf of Freeman had claimed Freeman's actions were due to mental illness; however, this was dispelled by the custody battle revelation.

On 28 March 2011, the jury found Freeman guilty of the murder of his daughter. On 11 April 2011 Freeman was sentenced to life in prison with a minimum non-parole period of 32 years. Justice Paul Coghlan called the killing a "fundamental breach of trust", saying "What Darcey's last thoughts might have been does not bear thinking about, and her death must have been a painful and protracted one". Freeman attempted to appeal this sentence in May 2011 but was unsuccessful.

Media 
The murder was featured on TV series Crimes That Shook Australia.

References

1972 births
2009 crimes in Australia
Filicides in Australia
Living people